Halenijagal  is a village in the southern state of Karnataka, India. It is located in the Nelamangala taluk of Bangalore Rural district.

Demographics 
Halenijagal had population of 1,006 of which 507 are males while 499 are females as per report released by Census India 2011.

Geography 
The total geographical area of village is 773.39 hectares.

Bus Route from Bengaluru City 
Yeshwantapura - Darasahalli - Nelamangala - Dabaspete

See also 

 Bettadahosahalli
 Bengaluru Rural District

References

External links 

Villages in Bangalore Rural district